There are at least 129 named mountains in Powell County, Montana.
 Alloy Mountain, el. 
 Antelope Hill, el. 
 Apex Mountain, el. 
 Arrastra Mountain, el. 
 Bailey Mountain, el. 
 Baldy, el. 
 Ballard Hill, el. 
 Bartlett Mountain, el. 
 Bison Mountain, el. 
 Black Mountain, el. 
 Black Mountain, el. 
 Black Mountain, el. 
 Blacktail Mountain, el. 
 Brown Sandstone Peak, el. 
 Bugle Mountain, el. 
 Bullet Nose Mountain, el. 
 Butcher Mountain, el. 
 Campbell Mountain, el. 
 Cardinal Peak, el. 
 Cayuse Mountain, el. 
 Chamberlain Mountain, el. 
 Charlotte Peak, el. 
 Cliff Mountain, el. 
 Conger Point, el. 
 Count Peak, el. 
 Crescent Mountain, el. 
 Crimson Peak, el. 
 Daly Peak, el. 
 Deer Lodge Mountain, el. 
 Devil Mountain, el. 
 Devine Peak, el. 
 Dunham Point, el. 
 Dunigan Mountain, el. 
 East Goat Mountain, el. 
 East Spread Mountain, el. 
 Echo Mountain, el. 
 Electric Peak, el. 
 Elevation Mountain, el. 
 Emerson Peak, el. 
 Esmeralda Hill, el. 
 Fault Peak, el. 
 Fenn Mountain, el. 
 Flame Peak, el. 
 Flatiron Mountain, el. 
 Foolhen Mountain, el. 
 Fossil Mountain, el. 
 Goat Mountain, el. 
 Gordon Mountain, el. 
 Grace Mountain, el. 
 Granite Mountain, el. 
 Gravely Mountain, el. 
 Green Mountain, el. 
 Gust Mountain, el. 
 Haystack Mountain, el. 
 Hoodoo Mountain, el. 
 Irish Mine Hill, el. 
 Iron Mountain, el. 
 Jericho Mountain, el. 
 Jones Mountain, el. 
 Jumbo Mountain (Powell County, Montana), el. 
 Kershaw Mountain, el. 
 Kid Mountain, el. 
 Lake Mountain, el. 
 Lena Peak, el. 
 Leota Peak, el. 
 Little Apex Mountain, el. 
 Little Baldy, el. 
 Little Red Hills, el. 
 Lone Tree Hill, el. 
 Lost Horse Mountain, el. 
 Luke Mountain, el. 
 Marcum Mountain, el. 
 Marshall Mountain, el. 
 Matt Mountain, el. 
 McCabe Mountain, el. 
 McCabe Point, el. 
 Mineral Hill, el. 
 Mineral Hill (Montana) 2, el. 
 Monahan Mountain, el. 
 Monture Hill, el. 
 Monture Mountain, el. 
 Morrell Mountain, el. 
 Moser Mountain, el. 
 Mount Powell, el. 
 Negro Mountain, el. 
 Nevada Mountain, el. 
 Nome Point, el. 
 North Chimney Peak, el. 
 North Chimney Peak, el. 
 O'Donnell Mountain, el. 
 Ogden Mountain, el. 
 O'Keefe Mountain, el. 
 Old Baldy Mountain, el. 
 Omar Mountain, el. 
 Ovando Mountain, el. 
 Packrat Mountain, el. 
 Patrol Point, el. 
 Pikes Peak, el. 
 Pilot Peak, el. 
 Pinnacle Peak, el. 
 Puma Peak, el. 
 Pyramid Peak, el. 
 Railley Mountain, el. 
 Red Butte, el. 
 Saddle Mountain, el. 
 Scarface Peak, el. 
 Scintilla Mountain, el. 
 Shale Peak, el. 
 Shamrock Point, el. 
 Shaw Mountain, el. 
 South Chimney Peak, el. 
 South Chimney Peak, el. 
 Spire Mountain, el. 
 Spread Mountain, el. 
 Spud Point, el. 
 Sturgeon Mountain, el. 
 Sugarloaf Mountain, el. 
 Tillson Peak, el. 
 Tour Mountain, el. 
 Trap Mountain, el. 
 Trapper Mountain, el. 
 Treasure Mountain, el. 
 Trio Mountain, el. 
 Una Mountain, el. 
 White River Butte, el. 
 White Rocks Mountain, el. 
 Windy Rock, el. 
 Woodtick Mountain, el. 
 Youngs Mountain, el.

See also
 List of mountains in Montana
 List of mountain ranges in Montana

Notes

Landforms of Powell County, Montana
Powell